Carola Ingrid Boomes (née Hoffmann, born 6 November 1962 in Goslar) is a German former field hockey player who competed in the 1988 Summer Olympics. In total, she represented West Germany in 70 matches.

References

External links
 

1962 births
Living people
German female field hockey players
Olympic field hockey players of West Germany
Field hockey players at the 1988 Summer Olympics
People from Goslar
Sportspeople from Lower Saxony
20th-century German women
21st-century German women